The Gurdon Light is a mystery light located near railroad tracks in a wooded area of Gurdon, Arkansas. It is the subject of local folklore and has been featured in local media and on Unsolved Mysteries and Mysteries at the Museum. The tracks are no longer in use, and the rails at least partially removed/covered, but it remains one of the most popular Halloween attractions in the area. The light has been ascribed various colors, ranging from blue, green or white, to orange, and has been described as bobbing around. Its exact location is said to vary and witnesses have described it appearing at various times of day or night.

Folklore

According to folklore, the light originates from a lantern of a railroad worker who was killed when he fell into the path of a train. The legend states that the man's head was separated from his body and was never found, and that the light that people see comes from his lantern as he searches for it. In another variation, the light is a lantern carried by railway foreman Will McClain, who was killed in the vicinity during a confrontation with one of his workers, Louis McBride in 1931. McClain believed McBride was the one who removed the spikes from a section of track, causing a freight train to derail, in an attempt to derail the Sunshine Special passenger train. Some sources say the confrontation was about how many hours McBride was allowed to work due to the Great Depression. McBride confessed to the murder and was executed by electrocution.

Causes
The lights are believed by some to be from passing cars on the highway in the distance (which looks like small floating lights that flash off in the distance).

Some believe that it's caused by piezoelectricity from the constant stress that the area's underground quartz crystals are under.  Gurdon sits above large amounts of quartz crystals and the New Madrid fault line.

See also 
 Aleya (Ghost light), Bengal
 Aurora
 Brown Mountain Lights
 Chir Batti
 Cohoke Light
 Hessdalen light
 Maco light
 Marfa lights
 Min Min light
 Naga fireball
 Paulding Light
 Will-o'-the-wisp

References

External links
Encyclopedia of Arkansas:The Gurdon Light
Map depicting site of the Gurdon light

Clark County, Arkansas
Natural history of Arkansas
Atmospheric ghost lights
Paranormal
Supernatural legends